The women's 4 × 400 metres relay event at the 2017 European Athletics Indoor Championships was held on 5 March at 19:00 local time as a straight final.

Records

Results

References

4 × 400 metres relay at the European Athletics Indoor Championships
2017 European Athletics Indoor Championships